The Federal Secretary of Lega Nord is the chairman of the Lega Nord, a political party in Italy.

List

Tenure

Timeline

Lega Nord politicians